Olympia, officially Archaia Olympia ("Ancient Olympia"), is a small town in Elis on the Peloponnese peninsula in Greece, famous for the nearby archaeological site of the same name. This site was a major Panhellenic religious sanctuary of ancient Greece, where the ancient Olympic Games were held every four years throughout Classical antiquity, from the 8th century BC to the 4th century AD. They were restored on a global basis in 1894 in honor of the ideal of peaceful international contention for excellence.

The sacred precinct, named the Altis, was primarily dedicated to Zeus, although other gods were worshipped there. The games conducted in his name drew visitors from all over the Greek world as one of a group of such "Panhellenic" centres, which helped to build the identity of the ancient Greeks as a nation. Despite the name, it is nowhere near Mount Olympus in northern Greece, where the Twelve Olympians, the major deities of Ancient Greek religion, were believed to live.

Ancient history records that Pisa and Elis, other villages in the region, contended with Olympia for management of the precinct, and that Olympia won, implying that the village was not identical to the precinct. The putative location of the ancient village is the modern village, which appears to have been inhabited continuously since ancient times.

The archaeological site held over 760 significant buildings, and ruins of many of these survive. Of special interest to Greeks of all times is the Pelopion, the tomb of the quasi-mythical king, ancestor of the Atreids, the two kings who led their domains to war against Troy. The Peloponnesus is named for Pelops. The tomb suggests that he may not have been entirely mythical.

Another location that has a special interest to both ancients and moderns is the stadium. It is basically a field with start and end lines marked off by transverse curbing. The athletes entered under an archway of a vaulted corridor at the start. Spectators sat mainly on the field's sloping flanks. The length of this field became the standard stadion, an ancient Greek unit of distance, which appears in all the geographers. The stadium has been resurrected for Olympic use with no intentional alteration of the ancient topography. Transient stands are easily thrown up and removed.

The first major games to have been played at in the Olympia stadium were said to have first begun in the 720s. These prestigious ancient games took place during the festival of Zeus at Olympia. Olympia was a sanctuary, but it was within the independent state of Elis, and since the Eleans managed the games, there was sometimes bias. The famous Olympic truce only mandated safe passage for visitors and did not stop all wars in Greece or even at Olympia.

The village services the adjacent archaeological site to the southeast. The Kladeos River forms the site's western border. Visitors walk over the bridge to find themselves in front of the main gate. Full visitation is an extensive walking event. Some excavation is in progress there frequently. Moveable artifacts for the most part have found a home in one of the site's three museums.

Ancient site

Architectural summary

According to Pausanias, there were over 70 temples in total, as well as treasuries, altars, statues, and other structures dedicated to many deities.  Somewhat in contrast to Delphi, where a similar large collection of monuments were tightly packed within the temenos boundary, Olympia sprawled beyond the boundary wall, especially in the areas devoted to the games.

To the north of the sanctuary can be found the Prytaneion and the Philippeion, as well as the array of treasuries representing the various city-states. The Metroon lies to the south of these treasuries, with the Echo Stoa to the east. The hippodrome and later stadium were located east of the Echo Stoa. To the south of the sanctuary is the South Stoa and the bouleuterion, whereas the palaestra, the workshop of Pheidias, the gymnasion, and the Leonidaion lie to the west.

Olympia was also known for the gigantic chryselephantine (ivory and gold on a wooden frame) statue of Zeus that was the cult image in his temple, sculpted by Pheidias, which was named one of the Seven Wonders of the Ancient World by Antipater of Sidon. Very close to the Temple of Zeus which housed this statue, the studio of Pheidias was excavated in the 1950s. Evidence found there, such as sculptor's tools, corroborates this opinion. The ancient ruins sit north of the Alpheios River and south of Mount Kronos (named after the Greek deity Kronos). The Kladeos, a tributary of the Alpheios, borders the west.

Site plan

The Altis
It consisted of an arrangement of buildings, the most important of which are the Temple of Hera (or Heraion/Heraeum), the Temple of Zeus, the Pelopion, and open sites used for traditional activities, such as the area of the great altar of Zeus, where the largest sacrifices were made.

The Herakleian sanctuary
Pindar, the 5th-century-BC Theban poet, says that Heracles founded the "sacred precinct" (zatheon alsos) next to the tomb of Pelops in honor of Zeus, his own father, referring to the precinct founded as the Altis, and made the "encircling area a resting-place for feasting," honoring the river Alfeios and the 12 Olympian gods. He assigned the name "Hill of Cronus" to the previously unnamed hill, and then instituted the Olympic games. Pindar creates in a single, compact sentence, what has been called "Olympic space." The space is a work of man created by a sequence of operations: first, Herakles lays out (stathmato) the alsos with a surveying instrument called a stathme. Second, he "fixes" the border of the Altis (paxais Altin), and third clears the space around it (en katharo diekrine). Fourth, he "made" (etheke) ground (pedon) as an entertainment space (lusin) for festivals (dorpou). Then he goes on to "honor" the ford of the Alfeios (necessarily to the south), the 12 gods, and to name the unnamed hill for Kronos. Then he can hold the first games.

Pindar's statement is not the proper definition of a class, an Altis. There is nonesuch. If there was any such universal, it did not make the dictionaries; instead, the individual piece of real estate, the Altis, is always listed. Individuals are not specifics and cannot be defined; for instance, in "Socrates is a man" there is no universal, Socrates; instead, a previously existing individual is being assigned a specific, man. Similarly, Pindar assigns the Altis to "grove" and "sacred", but before he can do so, it must already exist. He cannot be defining it to exist, which it already does, and has existed, possibly long before. In that case the Altis might not always have been, or might not always be, either a grove or sacred, witness the same piece of modern land.

As to the content of the "grove," Pindar does not say, except that victory crowns were of olive, which would lack sacred significance if not from the Altis. Today trees have been allowed to grow over the site quasi-grove. These are primarily Cercis siliquastrum, colloquially "Judas-tree" (nothing to do with Judas), a pink-flowering low tree. If they are natural to the site now, they probably were in antiquity. Olea europaea, olive, is of course ubiquitous in the region, usually growing in planted groves, but sometimes wild. Platanus orientalis, the plane tree, is common in the area, and Pinus halepensis, Aleppo pine, which covered Kronion until the fire of 2007-2009.

There is not much indication of what structures were in the Altis, except the games must have been part of the "feasting" and therefore were held in the "resting-place." The size of the precinct must have varied as the site developed, as the original stadium is known to have extended well within the later east wall. That the temple of Zeus was built within the precinct is a reasonable assumption. As there is no trace of a succession of walls, the wall might reasonably be presumed to have been a late feature, but no later than Pindar.

The Pelopian sanctuary

Excavation of the Pelopion provided only opportunities for possible historic events rather than definitive knowledge of events and chronology. The classical Pelopion was a separate sanctuary defined by a peribolos wall dating to the 6th century BC, long after the conventional start of the Olympic games, 776 BC (which cannot be disrespected without tampering with the entire ancient Greek dating system). This was certainly a remodeling of a previously existing sanctuary of Pelops. A 1987-plus excavation of the Pelopion established "a continuous ceramic sequence for the 11th century onward" including submycenaean (1100-1000 BC) and protogeometric (1000-900 BC). There was a good sprinkling of "cultic" material (votive figurines and vases).

Etymologies
The name Altis was derived from a corruption of the Elean word also meaning "the grove" because the area was wooded, olive and plane trees in particular.

History

Prehistory

It used to be thought that the site had been occupied since about 1500 BC, with a religious cult of Zeus developing around 1000 BC. It may be that instead there was only a sanctuary from the 9th or 8th centuries, though the question remains in debate.  Others believe that remains of food and burnt offerings dating back to the 10th century BC give evidence of a long history of religious activity at the site. No buildings have survived from this earliest period of use.

Geometric and Archaic periods

The first Olympic festival was organized on the site by the authorities of Elis in the 8th century BC – with tradition dating the first games at 776 BC. Major changes were made to the site around 700 BC, including levelling land and digging new wells. Elis' power diminished and the sanctuary fell into the hands of the Pisatans in 676 BC. The Pisatans organized the games until the late 7th century BC.

The earliest evidence of building activity on the site dates from around 600 BC. At this time the Skiloudians, allies of the Pisatans, built the Temple of Hera. The Treasuries and the Pelopion were built during the course of the 6th century BC. The secular structures and athletic arenas were also under construction during this period including the Bouleuterion. The first stadium was constructed around 560 BC and it consisted of just a simple track. The stadium was remodelled around 500 BC with sloping sides for spectators and shifted slightly eastward. Over the course of the 6th century BC a range of sports were added to the Olympic festival. In 580 BC, Elis, in alliance with Sparta, occupied Pisa and regained the control over the sanctuary.

Classical period

The classical period, between the 5th and 4th centuries BC, was the golden age of the site at Olympia. A wide range of new religious and secular buildings as well as structures were made.

The Temple of Zeus was built mid 5th century BC. Its size, scale and ornaments were beyond anything previously constructed on the site. The Greek Baths and further sporting facilities, including the final iteration of the stadium, and the hippodrome (for chariot-racing) were constructed. The Prytaneion was built at the northwest side of the site in 470 BC.

In the late classical period, further structures were added to the site. The Metroon was constructed near the Treasuries around 400 BC. The erection of the Echo Stoa, around 350 BC, separated the sanctuary from the area of the games and stadium. The South Stoa was built at the southern edge of the sanctuary at approximately the same time.

Hellenistic period

The late 4th century BC saw the erection of the Philippeion. Around 300 BC the largest building on the site, the Leonidaion, was constructed to house important visitors. Due to the increasing significance of the games, further athletic buildings were constructed including the Palaestra (3rd century BC), Gymnasion (2nd century BC) and bath houses (c.300 BC). Finally, in 200 BC, a vaulted archway was erected linking the entrance of the stadium to the sanctuary.

Roman period
During the Roman period, the games were opened up to all citizens of the Roman Empire. A programme of new buildings and extensive repairs, including to the Temple of Zeus, took place. In 150 AD, the Nympheum (or Exedra) was built. New baths replaced the older Greek examples in 100 AD and an aqueduct was constructed in 160 AD.

The 3rd century saw the site suffer heavy damage from a series of earthquakes. Invading tribes in 267 AD led to the centre of the site being fortified with material robbed from its monuments. Despite the destruction, the Olympic festival continued to be held at the site until the last Olympiad in 393 AD, after which the Christian emperor Theodosius I implemented a ban. The Temple of Zeus was apparently destroyed around 426 AD, during the persecution of pagans in the late Roman Empire, following an edict by Theodosius II enforcing the ban on pagan festivals.  The workshop of Pheidias was turned into a Basilica and the site was inhabited by a Christian community. Archaeological evidence suggests that small scale Olympic events (perhaps in Christian guise) were still being held secretly until Justinian's plague and two earthquakes devastated the place mid 6th century. Repeated floods ensured that the settlement was finally abandoned altogether in the early 7th Century.

Archaeology

Discovery and early excavations

Over time the site was buried under alluvial deposits, up to 8 metres deep, long thought to be the result of river flooding. Modern research hypothesizes instead—based on the presence of mollusc and gastropod shells and foraminifera— that the site was buried by sea waters resulting from repeated tsunamis. The exact site was re-discovered in 1766 by the English antiquarian Richard Chandler. Since then, the site had been visited by several other antiquarian-travellers such as Louis-François-Sébastien Fauvel, François Pouqueville, William Gell, Charles Robert Cockerell and William Martin Leake.

The first excavation was not carried out until 1829, when the French archaeologists of the "Expedition Scientifique de Morée" arrived on the site of the sanctuary at Olympia on 10 May 1829. As most of the buildings were invisible, the general identification was made possible thanks to the more precise descriptions of Edward Dodwell and John Spencer Stanhope. The French archaeologists spent six weeks on the site. Léon-Jean-Joseph Dubois (director of the section of Archaeology) and Abel Blouet (director of the section of Architecture and Sculpture) undertook the first excavations, accompanied by the painters Pierre Achille Poirot, Pierre Félix Trézel and Amaury-Duval. The site was divided topographically into squares, trenches were dug, excavations were undertaken in straight lines, and models for restoration were proposed: archaeology was becoming rationalized, and it was in this way that the location and identity of the Temple of Zeus were determined for the first time.

1875–1881

Since the 1870s, the excavation and preservation of Ancient Olympia has been the responsibility of the German Archaeological Institute at Athens. The first major excavation of Olympia began in 1875, funded by the German government after negotiation of exclusive access by Ernst Curtius. Other archaeologists responsible for the dig were Gustav Hirschfeld, George Treu, Adolf Furtwängler (who worked alongside architects), A. Boetticher, Wilhelm Dörpfeld, and Richard Borrmann. They excavated the central part of the sanctuary including the Temple of Zeus, Temple of Hera, Metroon, Bouleuterion, Philipeion, Echo Stoa, Treasuries and Palaestra. Important finds included sculptures from the Temple of Zeus, the Nike of Paeonius, the Hermes of Praxiteles and many bronzes. In total 14,000 objects were recorded. The finds were displayed in a museum on the site.

1900–1950
Excavation continued in a more limited way by Dörpfeld between 1908 and 1929 but a new systematic excavation began in 1936 on the occasion of the 1936 Summer Olympics in Berlin under Emil Kunze and Hans Schleif. Their excavation focus was on the area to the south of the stadium, the South Stoa, bath complex and gymnasion.

1950 to present
Between 1952 and 1966, Kunze continued the excavation joined by architect Alfred Mallwitz. They excavated Pheidias' workshop, the Leonidaion and the north wall of the stadium. They also excavated the southeast section of the sanctuary and out of approximately 140 debris pits found many bronze and ceramic objects along with terracotta roof tiles.

Mallwitz took charge of the excavations between 1972 and 1984 revealing important dating evidence for the stadium, graves, and the location of the Prytaneion. From 1984 to 1996, Helmut Kyrieleis took over the site and the focus shifted to the earlier history of the sanctuary with excavation of the Prytaneion and Pelopion.

In March 2021, archaeologists announced the discovery of a 2500 year-old unbroken bronze bull idol near to the temple of Greek deity Zeus. According to archaeologist Zaharaoula Leventouri, one of the statue's horns stuck to the ground after a heavy rainfall and was carefully removed from the area. Researchers also revealed fine pottery remains dated back to Greece's Geometric period.

Modern Olympia

The municipality

The ancient site of the games had been included during all the intervening centuries within a community yet called Olympia. In modern terms it became Archaia Olympia, "Ancient Olympia," and was a deme, or municipality, of its own. In 2011 it was combined for reasons of economy of government with three other former demes within which union the four became municipal units. The terminology can be confusing, as "ancient Olympia" can be either the modern municipal unit, or only the site of the ruins.

The town has a train station and is the easternmost terminus of the line of Olympia-Pyrgos (Ilia). The train station with the freight yard to its west is located about 300 m east of the town centre. It is linked by GR-74, and the new road was opened in the 1980s. The next stretch N and NE of Olympia opened in 2005. The highway passes north of the ancient ruins. A reservoir is located a few kilometres to the west, impounding the Alfeios River for hydroelectric purposes. The catchment up to Olympia is flat or rolling and is agricultural; upstream from Olympia the river drains the foothills of the mountains. Much of the land around the archaeological site is given to dendriculture; that is, symmetric rows of olive trees.

The site and town of Olympia were severely threatened and nearly damaged by the 2007 forest fires.

Municipal units

The name of Archaia Olympia ("Ancient Olympia") was extended to the new municipality of 2011. Four former municipalities became municipal units:
Archaia Olympia
Foloi
Lampeia
Lasiona

Archaia Olympia now applied to both a municipality and a unit. The municipality has an area of 545.121 km2, the municipal unit 178.944 km2.

For the subdivisions of the municipal units of Foloi, Lampeia, and Lasiona, see under those topics. The municipal unit of Archaia Olympia is divided into the following communities (villages within the communities given in brackets):

Historical population

Notable people
Panagiotis Kondylis, one of the most prominent modern Greek thinkers and philosophers, was born and raised in Olympia.

When Pierre de Coubertin, the founder of the International Olympic Committee, died in 1937, a monument to him was erected at ancient Olympia and, emulating Evangelis Zappas, whose head is buried under a statue in front of the Zappeion, his heart was buried at the monument.

Reinstitution of the games
After suppression of the ancient Olympic Games in 394 AD by Theodosius I, the spirit of the games, international peaceful competition by individuals for excellence, continued. The games were resurrected in 1894 based on the ancient model, but more international than ever. The ideology of the new games turned to the site of ancient Olympia for its inspiration, where even the ruins assumed a symbolic significance. The Olympic flame of the modern-day Olympic Games is lit by reflection of sunlight in a parabolic mirror in front of the Temple of Hera and then transported by a torch to the place where the Games are held. When the modern Olympic Games came to Athens in 2004, the men's and women's shot put competition was held at the restored Olympia stadium

Buildings and monuments in Olympia have been selected numerous times as main motif of collectors' coins. One of the recent samples is the €100 Greek Crypt of Olympia commemorative coin, minted in 2003 to commemorate the 2004 Summer Olympics. In the obverse of the coin, the Crypt of Olympia is depicted. The crypt is a long and narrow vaulted passage through which the athletes and judges entered the Stadium, signifying the opening of the games.

See also
 List of settlements in Elis
 Archaeological Museum of Olympia
 German Archaeological Institute at Athens
 Museum of Ancient Greek Technology in Katakolo

Notes

Citations

Bibliography
  
 
Blouet, A., Ravoisié, A., Poirot, A., Trézel, F., and  de Gournay, F. (1831, 1833, 1838). Expedition scientifique de Morée ordonnée par le Gouvernement Français ; Architecture, Sculptures, Inscriptions et Vues du Péloponèse, des Cyclades et de l'Attique, 3 Volumes, Firmin Didot, Paris.
 
Gates, C. (2003). Ancient cities: the archaeology of urban life in the Ancient Near East and Egypt, Greece and Rome. Psychology Press, 2003. p. 234
Saïtas, I. et al. (2011, 2017). The work of the Morea scientific expedition 1829-1838, 2 Parts, edited by Yiannis Saïtas, editions Melissa, Athens. 
Wilson, N. (2013). Encyclopedia of Ancient Greece. Routledge, 2013. p. 513, 
Young, D. C. (1996). The Modern Olympics – A Struggle for Revival. The Johns Hopkins University Press, 1996.

External links

  Publications of the German excavation in the 19th century digitised by the library of the University of Heidelberg
  Extensive black-and-white photo-essays  of the site and related artifacts
 

 
Temples in ancient Olympia
Ancient Olympic Games
Populated places in Elis
Municipalities of Western Greece
World Heritage Sites in Greece
Archaeological sites in the Peloponnese (region)
Geography of ancient Elis
 
Roman sites in Greece
Archaeological sites in Western Greece
Ancient Greek archaeological sites in Greece
Populated places in ancient Elis